Oxyuridae is a family of nematode worms of the class Secernentea. It consists of eight genera, one of which contains the human pinworm (Enterobius vermicularis).

References

Oxyurida
Parasitic nematodes of vertebrates
Nematode families